The Cycling at the 1981 Southeast Asian Games were held at Romulo Highway and Kabataang Barangay Velodrome Manila, Philippine. Cycling events was held between 7 December to 11 December 1981.

Medal summary

Medal table

References

1981 Southeast Asian Games events
Southeast Asian Games
1981
1981 in track cycling